Zenon Baranowski (21 November 1930 – 12 October 1980) was a Polish sprinter. He competed in the men's 4 × 100 metres relay at the 1956 Summer Olympics.

References

1930 births
1980 deaths
Athletes (track and field) at the 1956 Summer Olympics
Polish male sprinters
Olympic athletes of Poland
Place of birth missing